Intelsat 902 (IS-902) was the second of 9 new Intelsat satellites launched in August 2001 at 62°E. It will provide telecommunications and television broadcast to Europe, Sub-Saharan Africa, Central Asia, the Far East and Australia through its 44 C band and 12 Ku band transponders.

Specifications
 Propulsion: R-4D-15 HiPAT
 Power: 2 deployable solar arrays, batteries
 Perigee: 
 Apogee: 
 Semimajor axis: 
 Orbital period: 0.02393 hours
 Orbital inclination: 0.0 degrees
 Transponders: 44 C band and 12 Ku band
 Beacons: 3947.5RHCP, 3948.0RHCP, 3950.0V, 3952.0RHCP, 3952.5RHCP, 11198RHCP, 11452RHCP

References

External links

Intelsat satellites
Spacecraft launched in 2001
Satellites using the SSL 1300 bus